Mary Somerville was  launched in 1835 at Liverpool. She spent her career as an East Indiaman, sailing primarily for Taylor, Potter & Co., of Liverpool, for whom she was built. 

Mary Sommmerville was beached on 18 October 1837 at Kingstown, County Dublin. She was on a voyage from Liverpool, Lancashire to Calcutta. She was refloated on 30 November and taken into Dublin.
A report from Liverpool dated 21 March 1838 stated that Mary Somerville, bound for Calcutta, had collided on 20 March at Liverpool with the 97-year old , sinking her. However, her crew was saved.

Loss: In October 1852 Mary Somerville departed from Saint Helena for Liverpool. She was presumed subsequently to have foundered with the loss of all hands. A chest from the ship washed up at Saint Michael's Mount, Cornwall on 11 January 1853.

Citations

1835 ships
Age of Sail merchant ships of England
Maritime incidents in October 1837
Maritime incidents in March 1838
Maritime incidents in October 1852
Ships lost with all hands